Mohamed El Ouriachi Choulay (born 13 January 1996), known simply as Moha or Choulay, is a Moroccan footballer who plays as a left winger.

Career
Moha began his career with Club Esportiu La Floresta, followed by spells with RCD Espanyol, before joining FC Barcelona's youth ranks in 2012. He helped the Juvenil A side to victory in the 2013–14 UEFA Youth League after defeating Benfica 3–0 in the final. He made a couple appearances as an unused substitute for Barcelona B before he decided to turn down the offer of a new contract and signed with English club Stoke City in July 2015.

On 15 August 2016, Moha joined League One side Shrewsbury Town on a six-month loan along with Stoke teammate George Waring. He made his professional debut the next day in a 3–0 defeat away at Charlton Athletic, replacing Louis Dodds after 69 minutes. He ended his loan with the Shrews on 22 November 2016 after making six appearances.

On 28 January 2017, Moha joined Scottish Premiership side Heart of Midlothian on loan for the remainder of the 2016–17 season. He made his top-flight debut the following day, replacing Sam Nicholson for the final 31 minutes of a 4–0 loss at leaders Celtic. He returned to Barcelona in August 2017 to play on loan for Espanyol B.

In June 2018, Moha signed for fellow Catalan club CF Badalona in Segunda División B. He dropped down to Tercera División in August 2019, signing for another team in the region, CE L'Hospitalet.

Career statistics

Honours
Barcelona
UEFA Youth League: 2013–14

References

External links

1996 births
Living people
People from Nador
Moroccan footballers
English Football League players
Stoke City F.C. players
Shrewsbury Town F.C. players
Heart of Midlothian F.C. players
RCD Espanyol B footballers
CF Badalona players
CE L'Hospitalet players
Association football midfielders
Spain youth international footballers
Moroccan expatriate footballers
Expatriate footballers in Spain
Expatriate footballers in England
Moroccan expatriate sportspeople in Spain
Moroccan expatriate sportspeople in England
Expatriate footballers in Scotland
Moroccan expatriate sportspeople in Scotland
Scottish Professional Football League players
Segunda División B players
Tercera División players